Jinēndra Varṇī, one of the best-known Jain scholars of the 20th century,  is known for his pioneering five-volume Jainendra Siddhanta Kosha and Saman Suttam compilation, the first text accepted by all Jain orders in 1800 years.

Jinēndra Varṇī was born in Panipat in the year 1922 to a prominent Agrawal Jain family. He struggled all his life with health problems. In 1938 he lost one lung due to tuberculosis. Still he studied electrical and wireless engineering.

Jinēndra Varṇī left home in 1957 and during his wanderings he joined the well-known Ganesh Varni, who ordained him a kṣullaka or junior monk. However, he was unable to follow the vratas of a kṣullaka due to his health problems and returned to being a Śrāvaka.

In 1983, approaching death, Jinēndra Varṇī began Sallekhana on 12 April 1983 and was ordained again a kṣullaka by Acharya Vidyasagar. He died in samādhi on 24 May 1983.

See also
 Agrawal Jain

References

Further reading 
https://web.archive.org/web/20040725080840/http://www.dailytimes.com.pk/default.asp?page=story_12-7-2004_pg7_24

Scholars of Jainism
Indian Jain monks
20th-century Indian Jains
20th-century Jain monks
20th-century Indian monks
1922 births
1983 deaths